Thomas Parran (February 12, 1860 – March 29, 1955) was an American politician.

Born near St. Leonard, Maryland, Parran attended the public schools and Charlotte Hall Military Academy.  He was a member of the Maryland House of Delegates from 1884 to 1888, and served as chief deputy collector for the Bureau of Internal Revenue for the Baltimore district from 1889 to 1893.  He engaged in farming at St. Leonard in 1890, and served in the Maryland State Senate from 1892 to 1894.  He was the assistant enrolling clerk (1895–1897) and index clerk (1897–1901) of the House of Representatives.  He was also clerk of the Maryland Court of Appeals from 1901 to 1907.

Parran served as delegate to the Republican National Conventions of 1888, 1904, and 1908.  He was elected from the fifth district of Maryland as a Republican to the Sixty-second Congress, and served from March 4, 1911 to March 3, 1913.  He was an unsuccessful candidate for reelection in 1912 to the Sixty-third Congress, and an unsuccessful candidate for the U.S. Senate in a 1913 special election.

Parran served as a member of the Maryland Road Commission from 1913 to 1916 and as Immigration Commissioner in 1917 and 1918.  He resumed farming interests, and served as a member of the board of directors of the County Trust Company in Prince Frederick, Maryland. His name is engraved on the Hanover Street Bridge, Baltimore.   He died in St. Leonard, and is interred in Christ Church Cemetery of Port Republic, Maryland.

References

1860 births
1955 deaths
Republican Party members of the Maryland House of Delegates
Republican Party Maryland state senators
Charlotte Hall Military Academy alumni
Republican Party members of the United States House of Representatives from Maryland
People from Calvert County, Maryland